Ingemar Haraldsson (3 February 1928 – 19 March 2004) was a Swedish football goalkeeper who represented Sweden at the 1958 FIFA World Cup where he served as a backup goalkeeper behind Kalle Svensson. He also played for Kalmar FF and IF Elfsborg.

References

External links 
 FIFA profile

1928 births
2004 deaths
Swedish footballers
Sweden international footballers
Association football goalkeepers
Allsvenskan players
Kalmar FF players
IF Elfsborg players
1958 FIFA World Cup players